Ameobi is a surname. Notable people with the surname include:

Sammy Ameobi (born 1992), English footballer
Shola Ameobi (born 1981), Nigerian footballer
Tomi Ameobi (born 1988), English footballer

Surnames of Nigerian origin